The Nyuzim is a river in Perm Krai and Komi Republic, Russia, a right tributary of the Kolva, which in turn is a tributary of the Vishera. It starts in the Komi Republic, near the border with Perm Krai.

References 

Rivers of Perm Krai
Rivers of the Komi Republic